Taraxacum centrasiaticum is a rare and little-known species of dandelion known only from alpine meadows at an elevation of  in the Xinjiang Uyghur Autonomous Region of western China.

References

centrasiaticum
Endemic flora of China
Flora of Xinjiang
Plants described in 1995